Andresen and the parallel form Andreasen (Norwegian cognate Andreassen) are Danish-Norwegian patronymic surnames meaning "son of Andreas". It has a similar origin as the name Andersen. It may refer to:

 Alexandra Andresen (born 1996), Norwegian heiress, world's youngest billionaire
 August H. Andresen (1890-1958), American politician
 Björn Andrésen (born 1955), Swedish actor
 Frode Andresen (born 1973), Norwegian biathlete
 Martin Andresen (born 1977), Norwegian footballer
 Momme Andresen (1857–1951), German industrial chemist who invented the photographic developer "Rodinal"
 Sophia de Mello Breyner Andresen (1919-2004), Portuguese poet

Also:
 Andresen v. Maryland, U.S. law case

See also 
 Andreasen
 Andersen
 Andreessen (disambiguation)
 Andriessen
 Andreassen
 Andreasson

References 

Danish-language surnames
Norwegian-language surnames
Patronymic surnames